Pinus latteri, or Tenasserim pine, is a pine native to Mainland Southeast Asia.

Description
The bark is orange-red, thick and deeply fissured at the base of the trunk, and thin and flaky in the upper crown. They open to 6–8 cm broad, often some time after maturity or following heating by forest fires, to release the seeds.

Related species
Pinus latteri is closely related to Sumatran pine (Pinus merkusii), which occurs further south in Southeast Asia in Sumatra and the Philippines; some botanists treat the two as conspecific (under the name P. merkusii, which was described first), but the Sumatran pine differs in shorter (15–20 cm) and slenderer (under 1 mm thick) leaves, smaller cones with thinner scales, the cones opening at maturity, and seeds only half the weight. It is also related to the group of Mediterranean pines including Aleppo pine and Turkish pine, which share many features with it.

Distribution and habitat
It grows in the mountains of southeastern Burma, northern Thailand, Laos, Cambodia, Vietnam, and on the Chinese island of Hainan.

The tree is named after the Tenasserim Hills between Myanmar and Thailand.

References

External links

Latteri
Latteri
Trees of Indo-China
Tenasserim Hills
Taxa named by Francis Mason